Camp Massad may refer to:
 Camp Massad (Manitoba), a Jewish summer camp at Winnipeg Beach, Manitoba
 Camp Massad (Montreal), a Jewish summer camp in Ste. Agathe, Quebec, based in Montreal
 Camp Massad (Poconos), a Jewish summer camp in Poconos, Pennsylvania, which closed down in 1981

 
Jewish summer camps